McEleny is a surname. Notable people with the surname include:

 Charlie McEleny (1873–1908), Irish footballer
 Maggie McEleny (born 1965), Scottish Paralympic swimmer